Kseniya Markitantova (born 15 July 1981) is a Ukrainian Paralympic archer.

She competed in the 2012 and 2016 Summer Paralympics in women's Compound.

References

Paralympic archers of Ukraine
Archers at the 2012 Summer Paralympics
Archers at the 2016 Summer Paralympics
Living people
Ukrainian female archers
1981 births
21st-century Ukrainian women